William "Bill" Nagle (1952–1993) was a pioneering American wreck diver.

Diving
 
Bill Nagle was one of the earliest divers to dive regularly beyond diver training agency specified depth limits for safe deep diving (normally 130 feet in sea water).  Nagle regularly dived to greater depths, and engaged in hazardous shipwreck penetration, often on previously unexplored shipwrecks.
 
Whilst Nagle was by no means the first diver to start diving at great depths (Sheck Exley was generating considerable fame even before Nagle engaging in extremely deep cave diving), it was his pioneering approach to wrecks that set him apart from other divers of his era.
 
In 1985 Bill Nagle led the team of divers, including Gary Gentile, Art Kirchner, Tom Packer, Mike Boring, John Moyer and Kenny Gascon, who recovered the bell of the Andrea Doria, which had previously been thought lost and unrecoverable.  The story of the recovery expedition is recounted in Gary Gentile's book, Andrea Doria: Dive to an Era.
 
Bill Nagle was also one of the first people in the Northeastern United States to commence dive chartering as a full-time business with the custom dive vessel, the Seeker.  The Seeker specialised in taking experienced wreck divers to the more remote and dangerous wrecks in the North East.  It became an extremely competitive business as diving deep wrecks became more popular, and Nagle's bitter feud with rival captain, Steve Bielenda, after the latter was designated "King of the Deep" in a feature in Time magazine is carefully chronicled in the book Shadow Divers.
 
In subsequent years, diving beyond recreational diving limits would become refined as a sport in itself, known as "technical diving", with its own dedicated training and procedures.  During Bill Nagle's prime, divers who exceeded agency specified safety limits were simply referred to as "gorilla divers".  Bill Nagle died shortly before the advent of trimix became popular amongst non-professional divers, dramatically reducing the risks associated with diving deep wrecks.  Today many of the wrecks that Bill Nagle first explored diving on air with outdated US Navy Decompression tables are routinely dived by divers who have received technical training and who are breathing trimix and using modern dive computers.

Alcoholism and death
 
The later years of Bill Nagle's life were dominated by a descent into alcoholism and drug abuse.  It was this disease that ultimately took his life at the age of 41.  His last great expedition was the exploration of German submarine U-869, although he was never physically able to dive on it.  Nagle died before the wreck was positively identified.

His close friend, John Chatterton refused to attend his funeral, insisting that the man inside the coffin was not his friend and associate - it was the monster who had killed Bill Nagle.  Richie Kohler, another diver closely connected with the U-869 expedition, was one of the pallbearers.

Footnotes

Bibliography

1952 births
1993 deaths
Alcohol-related deaths in the United States
American underwater divers
Place of birth missing
Place of death missing
Underwater diving explorers